Staka may refer to:
Roux#Cretan staka, a Cretan roux dish made from goat milk fat
Andrea Štaka, a Swiss film director
Chip Staka, a fictional character in a children's book Turntable Timmy
Staka Skenderova, a Bosnian Serb teacher, social worker, writer and folklorist